Alan Omar Rodríguez Ortiz (born 20 March 1996) is a Mexican professional footballer who plays as a midfielder for Liga MX club Toluca.

Career statistics

Club

References

External links
 
 
 

Living people
1996 births
Mexican footballers
Association football midfielders
Ascenso MX players
Liga MX players
Liga Premier de México players
Deportivo Toluca F.C. players
Loros UdeC footballers
Tlaxcala F.C. players
Footballers from Jalisco